In Search of Darkness: Part II is a 2020 documentary film written and directed by David A. Weiner. It is a sequel  to Weiner's 2019 documentary In Search of Darkness.

Unlike the first documentary, which featured more mainstream films, Part II focuses on more obscure movies and features over four hours of new interviews.

The documentary premiered on Shudder on April 26, 2021.

Reception

Movieweb praised the documentary, calling it "a hell of a ride from start to finish." 411Mania gave it 7/10 and opined that while the film was "not as good as the first," it was nonetheless "a worthy successor."

References

External links
 
 

2020 films
2020 documentary films
Documentary films about films
Documentary films about horror
2020s English-language films
Films directed by David A. Weiner